Pinky was a Japanese fashion magazine published by Shueisha. Launched in 2004 as a sister magazine of Seventeen, Pinky was targeted at teenagers and young women in their early 20s or early 30s. The headquarters of the magazine was in Tokyo. The indy rock band 0.8Syooogeki were signed to a contract with the magazine in 2008. Pinky officially ended publishing on 22 December 2009.

Special exclusive models 
Emi Suzuki
Nozomi Sasaki

Exclusive models 
Aimi
Mai Goto
Nami Inoue
Kelly
Coco Kinoshita
Yukina Kinoshita
Hitomi Nakahodo
Risa Nakama
Sayaka Ogata
Sachi
Hitomi Sakata
Shiori Sato
Mai Suzuri
Izumi Tokuda
Yumi Yamaoka
Mari Yaguchi

References 

2004 establishments in Japan
2009 disestablishments in Japan
Defunct women's magazines published in Japan
Fashion magazines published in Japan
Magazines established in 2004
Magazines disestablished in 2009
Magazines published in Tokyo
Women's fashion magazines